Elections to the Puducherry Legislative Assembly (French: Assemblée législative de Pondichéry) were held in March 1969, to elect members of the 3rd Puducherry Assembly. The Indian National Congress won the popular vote, but the Dravida Munnetra Kazhagam won the most seats, and M. O. H. Farook was appointed as the Chief Minister of Puducherry.

The territory of Pondicherry was delimited by the Delimitation Commission of India into 30 single-member constituencies.

Results

Elected members

See also
List of constituencies of the Puducherry Legislative Assembly
1969 elections in India

References

External links
  

1969 State Assembly elections in India
State Assembly elections in Puducherry
1960s in Pondicherry